Tom Belsø (27 August 1942 – 12 January 2020) was a motor racing driver, credited as the first Formula One driver from Denmark.

Early career
Belsø started out in touring cars, where he won his debut race and went on to become Scandinavian Touring Car Champion in 1969. He became a Formula Two racer in 1972, with his best result being a fourth place at the Albi Grand Prix, finishing 17th in the European F2 Championship. In 1973 he raced a Lola in Formula 5000. He also raced in a few non-championship Formula One races, finishing 7th in the 1973 Race of Champions and 8th in the 1973 BRDC International Trophy, and retiring in the 1974 BRDC International Trophy and 1975 Race of Champions. He contested the 1974 Rothmans 5000 European Championship winning at Snetterton and finishing 8th in the Series. He also competed in the 1977 Shellsport 5000/Libre series and finished fifth in a Radio Luxemburg-sponsored Lola T330-Chevrolet.

Formula One
Belsø qualified a Formula One Iso-Marlboro for the Frank Williams Racing Cars team at the 1973 Swedish Grand Prix, but could not start the race because his sponsorship money did not arrive. In 1974 he tried four times to qualify for Williams, but was only successful in South Africa and Sweden. In South Africa, the clutch on Belsø's FW failed on the first lap of the race. In Sweden, he finished his only complete Grand Prix, in eighth place.

Racing record

Complete Formula One results
(key)

‡ Belsø took part in practice only. The car was driven in the race by Howden Ganley.

Complete British Saloon Car Championship results
(key) (Races in bold indicate pole position; races in italics indicate fastest lap.)

Personal life 
In 1977 he founded Belso Cereals, a manufacturing company based in Peterborough.

On 12 January 2020 Belsø died from stomach cancer; he was 77 years old.

References

External links
Profile on F1 Rejects

1942 births
2020 deaths
Deaths from stomach cancer
Sportspeople from Copenhagen
People from Gladsaxe Municipality
Danish racing drivers
Danish Formula One drivers
Williams Formula One drivers
Deaths from cancer in England